Troitskoye (Bulğn) is a rural locality (a selo) and the administrative center of Tselinny District of the Republic of Kalmykia, Russia. Population:

References

Notes

Sources

Rural localities in Kalmykia
Tselinny District, Republic of Kalmykia